The 2003 Zhaosu earthquake, also known as the Syumbinskoe earthquake, occurred on December 1 at 01:38 UTC. The epicenter was located in the Almaty Region, Kazakhstan, near the Sino–Kazakh border. The earthquake had a magnitude of  6.0 and had a maximum observed intensity of VII (Very strong) on the Medvedev–Sponheuer–Karnik scale. The epicenter was close to the Zhaosu County, Xinjiang, where 10 people were reported dead, 73 people injured, and more than 800 buildings collapsed. Some people were evacuated in Zhaosu. The earthquake occurred in the cold winter, and the 30 cm ground snow covered the roads in the mountainous region and hindered the relief work.

See also
List of earthquakes in 2003
List of earthquakes in China

References

External links

2003 disasters in Asia
2003 earthquakes
2003 disasters in China
2003 in Kazakhstan
Almaty Region
Earthquakes in Xinjiang
Earthquakes in Kazakhstan